{{DISPLAYTITLE:C14H21NO2}}
The molecular formula C14H21NO2 (molar mass: 235.32 g/mol) may refer to:

 Amylocaine
 Berefrine
 Ethylbenzodioxolylpentanamine
 F-22 (psychedelic)
 Meprylcaine
 Methylenedioxybutylamphetamine
 Padimate A